GEHS may refer to:
 Gardner Edgerton High School, Gardener, Kansas, United States
 Glenbard East High School, Lombard, Illinois, United States
 Greenbrier East High School, Fairlea, West Virginia, United States

See also 
 GEH (disambiguation)